The North Texas Mean Green women's basketball team represents the University of North Texas (UNT) in NCAA Division I college basketball, competing as a member of Conference USA. Since their 1976 inception, the team has played its home games at the Super Pit.

Season-by season record
Tina Slinker has the most wins as coach of the Mean Green, with 241 (along with 287 losses), in 19 seasons as coach. Of the 10 winning seasons in school history, she had coached six of them. The Mean Green played in the Southland Conference from 1983 to 1996, the Big West Conference from 1996 to 2000, the Sun Belt Conference from 2000 to 2013 before joining Conference USA in 2013.

Postseason results

NCAA tournament results
The Mean Green have appeared in the NCAA tournament once.

WNIT Tournament results
The Mean Green have appeared in the Women's National Invitation Tournament three times. Their record is 0–3.

WBI results
The Mean Green have appeared in the Women's Basketball Invitational (WBI) once. Their record is 3–1.

Broadcasts
North Texas games are broadcast on the radio by the Mean Green Sports Network, part of the Learfield family. While games were previously on 88.1 KNTU, broadcasts are now streamed only on The Varsity Network app. Zac Babb handles play-by-play duties, while Michelle Brooks serves as a color commentator for home games and select road contests.

Television broadcasts are carried by ESPN+, ESPN3, and C-USA TV.

References

External links